Tara Matise is an American geneticist at Rutgers University. Since 2018, she has served as chair of the Department of Genetics. Her research interests span computational genetics, data science, and human genetics. She is co-director of the Rutgers University Genetics Coordinating Center.

Early life and education 
A native of Buffalo, New York, Matise attended high school at The Buffalo Seminary, a private secular school for girls, graduating in 1982, after which she attended Cornell University, where she earned a bachelor’s degree in biology with a concentration in genetics. She went on to earn a master’s degree in Genetic Counseling in 1988 from the University of Pittsburgh, and a doctorate in 1992 in human genetics from the University of Pittsburgh School of Public Health under the direction of Aravinda Chakravarti. Matise then worked as a postdoctoral fellow at the University of Pittsburgh, Columbia University and Rockefeller University. At Rockefeller, Matise worked under the supervision of Jürg Ott.

Research and career 
Matise moved to Rutgers University in 2000. She was appointed Head of the Computational Genetics Program in the Human Genetics Institute of New Jersey in 2014. In 2021, Matise was elected as a fellow in the American Association for the Advancement of Science. Matise began her career using genetic linkage to identify genes for genetic diseases.  Her contribution to the identification of the cystic fibrosis transmembrane conductance regulator (CFTR) gene was honored by the Cystic Fibrosis Foundation in 1990. Matise was the creator of MultiMap, a computer program that automated the construction of genetic linkage maps of the human genome. Her work facilitated the development of several genome-wide gene maps in humans and other organisms, and led to the development of the Rutgers Maps, which contain over 28,000 markers and provide an interpolated position for all human markers, the largest linkage map of human polymorphic markers. 

In 2008, Matise, as co-director of the Rutgers University Genetics Coordinating Center (RUGCC), was funded to lead a coordinating center for the multi-center Population Architecture using Genomics and Epidemiology (PAGE) study. Funded by the National Human Genome Research Institute (NHGRI) at the National Institutes of Health (NIH), the PAGE consortium was a pioneer in its approach to performing globally representative epidemiological genomics. The RUGCC was responsible for data quality control and dissemination, and study logistics. 

Matise, as co-lead of the RUGCC, was funded to direct the coordinating center for the National Human Genome Research Institute (NHGRI) Genome Sequencing Program in 2015. The program made use of genome sequencing to understand the genes that underpin inherited disease.

Selected publications

References 

Human Genome Project scientists
Rutgers University faculty
American geneticists
Cornell University alumni
American women scientists
Rockefeller University people
Columbia University faculty
Living people
Year of birth missing (living people)